Raeburn Park School was established in 1954 by a group of Singapore Harbour Board officials who were concerned about the shortage of educational facilities for non-service expatriate children. The school was located at Raeburn Park in a Harbour Board property overlooking Singapore harbour hence the school was also known as the Harbour Board School.

History 
Within 18 months the initial intake of 29 students had grown dramatically to a full-capacity school roll of 210 students. A house system was implemented and students were placed in one of the three houses: Keppel, Raffles or Ridley. The school colours were yellow and brown hence the boys' school uniforms consisted of yellow shirts and brown shorts and the girls wore yellow and white gingham check dresses.

The management of the school was transferred to the British European Association (BEA - now known as the British Association of Singapore) in 1960. The BEA also managed Tanglin Preparatory School. Following Singapore's independence in 1965, the Harbour Board was replaced by The Port of Singapore Authority, which informed the school their lease would not be renewed after 1972. The school moved to Alexandra Park  into the vacated Royal Army Ordnance Corps Mess and the adjoining cell block (from which the bars were removed!). The first overseas contracted teacher was appointed in 1973 although locally employed women, trained teachers from the UK, New Zealand or Australia, made up the majority of teachers. The same year a male Headteacher was employed and he was the first male member of staff. It was another two years before the first male teacher was appointed. In 1974 Raeburn Park came under management of Tanglin Trust Ltd which also managed Tanglin Preparatory and Weyhill Preparatory schools. The three schools were henceforth managed by one common Board of Governors.

In 1976 with the final withdrawal of British troops the school moved to Portsdown Road opposite Weyhill Preparatory School. Raeburn and Weyhill operated separately but shared the playing field between them. In 1981 Raeburn Park ceased to exist when it amalgamated with Tanglin Preparatory and Weyhill Preparatory Schools to form Tanglin Infant School and Tanglin Junior School.

The memory of Raeburn has lived on as the name of one of the senior houses within the present-day Tanglin Trust School. Moreover, the memory of the wonderful surroundings at Alexandra Park endures as one of the senior houses within the present-day Tanglin Trust School is called 'Alexandra'.

Head Teachers
 Lady Muriel Mackay  1954 - 1971
 Mrs Lorna Bunnet  1971 - 1972
 Mr Peter Gotts 1973 - 1976
 Mr Brian Trott 1977 - 1979
 Mr David Strachan 1979 - 1981

Alumni
The school has a thriving Alumni community which is designed to help current and former students stay in touch with each other and with the present day Tanglin Trust School. Children of Raeburn Park School Alumni qualify for priority entry at Tanglin Trust School, subject to producing documentary evidence of attendance. Additionally there is a Friends of Tanglin network which is open to all current and former teachers, support staff, Governors and parents.

References

External links

Official website

History of Singapore
International schools in Singapore